"Now It's On" is a song by American indie rock band Grandaddy, released as the first single from their third studio album Sumday (2003).

Release 

It peaked at number 23 on the UK Singles Chart.

Legacy 

The song was covered by Bad Books in 2012.

Track listing
 7" vinyl

 CD 1

 CD 2

 "Now It's On"
 "Getting Jipped"
 "Yeah Is What We Had" (video)

 DVD

References

External links 

 

2003 singles
Grandaddy songs
2003 songs
V2 Records singles